Hunter-Oliphant Block, also known as Browne-Davis Furniture Store, is a historic commercial building located at Oswego in Oswego County, New York.  It consists of adjacent brick buildings under single ownership; the three-story Hunter Building, built in 1882, and the Oliphant Building, built in 1880 as a three-story building with a fourth story added in the 1890s.  The buildings exhibits Italianate design details. The first floor has cast-iron storefronts.  The buildings have a common history dating to 1909 when they were combined as a single furniture store.

It was listed on the National Register of Historic Places in 1995.

References

Cast-iron architecture in New York (state)
Commercial buildings on the National Register of Historic Places in New York (state)
Italianate architecture in New York (state)
Commercial buildings completed in 1880
Buildings and structures in Oswego County, New York
1880 establishments in New York (state)
National Register of Historic Places in Oswego County, New York